The 1920 Kingstown Urban District Council election took place on Thursday 15 January 1920 as part of that year's Irish local elections.

Unionists emerged as the single largest party on the council, however, no party controlled an overall majority. Following the election the nationalist groups on the council formed a governing coalition. One of the actions of the new council was to rename the town, and council, to Dún Laoghaire, which is the Irish form of the original name for the town, Dunleary

Results by party

Results by electoral area

Monkestown Ward
Party breakdown: Unionist: 40.29% (1 seat), Sinn Féin: 39.87% (1 seat), Ind Nat: 19.83% (1 seat).

West Ward
Party breakdown: Sinn Féin: (3 seats), Unionist: (2 seats), Ind Nat: (2 seats), Labour: (1 seat).

East Ward
Party breakdown: Unionist: 52.54% (3 seats), Sinn Féin: 20.02% (1 seat), Labour: 13.16% (1 seat), Ratepayer 9.02% (0 seats), Nat 5.26% (0 seats).

Glasthule Ward
Party breakdown: Unionist: 46.87% (2 seats), Sinn Féin: 25.59% (1 seat), Labour: 15.84% (1 seat), Ind Nat: 9.10% (1 seat), Nat: 2.60% (0 seats).

References

1920 Irish local elections
Elections in Dún Laoghaire–Rathdown